The Underdog is a 1943 American drama film directed by William Nigh and starring Barton MacLane, Jan Wiley and Charlotte Wynters.

It is a story of how a dog overcomes his fear of fire when his young master is endangered by saboteurs.

Synopsis
After losing his farm, a man moves to a small town in World War II. His elder son is away serving in the army, while his younger boy struggles to fit in and clashes with a neighbourhood gang.

Cast
 Barton MacLane as John Tate
 Bobby Larson as Henry Tate
 Jan Wiley as Ämy Tate
 Charlotte Wynters as Mrs. Bailey
 Conrad Binyon a Spike
 Elizabeth Valentine as Mrs. Connors
 Kenneth Harlan as Eddie Mohr
 George Anderson as Kraeger
 Jack Kennedy as Officer O'Toole
 Frank Ellis as Old Timer
 I. Stanford Jolley as Friendly Soldier
 Jack Rockwell as Fireman

References

Bibliography
Parish, James Robert & Pitts, Michael R. Film directors: a guide to their American films. Scarecrow Press, 1974.

External links
 

1943 films
1943 drama films
1940s English-language films
American drama films
Films directed by William Nigh
Producers Releasing Corporation films
1940s American films